Salvador Allende was the president of Chile from 1970 until his 1973 suicide, and head of the Popular Unity government; he was a Socialist and Marxist elected to the national presidency of a liberal democracy in Latin America. In August 1973 the Chilean Senate declared the Allende administration to be "unlawful," Allende's presidency was ended by a military coup before the end of his term. During Allende's three years, Chile gradually transitioned into a socialist state.

During his tenure, Chilean politics reached a state of civil unrest amid political polarization, hyperinflation, lockouts, economic sanctions, CIA-sponsored interventionism and a failed coup in June 1973. Allende's coalition, Unidad Popular, faced the problem of being a minority in the congress and it was plagued by factionalism.

On 11 September 1973, a successful coup led by General Augusto Pinochet overthrew the government of Allende.

During the bombing of the presidential palace by the Chilean Air Force, President Allende, after mounting a brief armed resistance against the military, eventually committed suicide. In Chilean historiography, Allende's presidency is the last one of the period known as the "Presidential Republic" (1925–1973).

Allende becomes president

In the 1970 election, Allende ran with the Unidad Popular (UP or Popular Unity) coalition.
Succeeding the FRAP left-wing coalition, Unidad Popular comprised most of the Chilean Left: the Socialist Party, the Communist Party, the Radical Party, the Party of the Radical Left (until 1972), the Social Democratic Party, MAPU (Movimiento de Acción Popular Unitario) (in 1972, a splinter group – MAPU Obrero Campesino – emerged) and since 1971 the Christian Left.

Allende received a plurality with 36.2% of the vote. Christian Democrat Radomiro Tomic won 27.8% with a very similar platform to Allende's. Both Allende and Tomic promised to further nationalize the mineral industry and redistribute land and income among other new policies.
Conservative former president Jorge Alessandri, standing for the National Party, received slightly under 34.9% of the vote.

According to the constitution, Congress had to decide between the two candidates who had received the most votes. The precedent set on the three previous occasions this situation had arisen since 1932 was for Congress simply to choose the candidate with the largest number of votes; indeed, former president Alessandri had been elected in 1958 with 31.6% of the popular vote.

In this case, however, there was an active campaign against Allende's confirmation by Congress, including clandestine efforts to prevent him taking office, and his presidency was ratified only after he signed a "Statute of Constitutional Guarantees". This statute was suggested as a means to convince the majority of Christian Democrat senators that favoured Allessandri, as they doubted Allende's allegiance to democracy, or at least the UP's. After signing the statute, members of the Christian Democrat party in the Senate gave their vote in favor of Allende. It has been argued that given that less than the majority of the voters voted for him, Allende did not have a clear "mandate" to embark in the policies put forward on his program; however, it is also true that in the post-World War II period three out of the four previous presidents of Chile had, like Allende, also been elected with less than 50% of the vote, due in part to Chile's multi-party system. Specifically, the winners of the four presidential elections prior to Allende's 1970 election had won with: 56.1% (the 1964 election of Frei), 31.6% (the 1958 election of Alessandri), 46.8% (the 1952 election of Ibáñez) and 40.2% (the 1946 election of Gonzalez Videla). The legality of the 1970 election itself is not in dispute.

"The Chilean Way to Socialism"

In office, Allende pursued a policy he called "La vía chilena al socialismo" ("The Chilean Way to Socialism"). This included nationalization of certain large-scale industries (notably copper), of the healthcare system, continuation of his predecessor Eduardo Frei Montalva's policies regarding the educational system, a program of free milk for children, and land redistribution. The previous government of Eduardo Frei had already partly nationalised the copper industry by acquiring a 51 percent share in foreign owned mines. The primary U.S. business in Chile at this time was copper mining. The Chilean government sought to fully nationalize U.S. mining operations and the Chilean constitution required "just compensation" to be made according to "minimum international standards." However, the Allende government chose to hold mining companies liable for damages they caused to the state. Subsequently, Chile made significant deductions in computing the amount of compensation due to the North American industries. Such deductions included charges for "loans invested poorly" and "excessive profits" among other reasoning. "Excessive profits" were assessed dating back to the 1950s. Ultimately, deductions for "social and financial malfeasance" when combined with other deductions resulted in the total deductions greatly exceeding the base book values of the mining enterprises. In effect, compensation to three of the five nationalized mines was wholly eliminated by subjective deductions determined by Allende's government. Allende also nationalized coal mining in 1971, a move that was welcomed by the miners of Lota.

Chilean presidents were allowed a maximum of six years in office, which may explain Allende's haste to restructure the economy. He had a significant restructuring program organized.

At the beginning, there was broad support in Congress to expand the government's already large part of the economy, as the Popular Unity and Christian Democrats together had a clear majority. But the government's efforts to pursue these policies led to strong opposition by landowners, some middle-class sectors, the rightist National Party, financiers, and the Roman Catholic Church (which in 1973 was displeased with the direction of the educational policy). Eventually the Christian Democrats united with the National Party in Congress.

The Popular Unity coalition itself was far from unanimous. Allende himself said he was committed to democracy and represented a more moderate faction of his Socialist Party. He was supported by the Communist Party, that—despite being ultimately less committed to representative democracy—favoured a cautious, gradual approach. For example, the Communists urged to find a compromise with the Christian Democrats and supported the application of reforms through Congress. In contrast, the radical leftist wing of the Socialist Party wanted to smash the capitalist system at once, even if that meant violent actions. If one includes smaller parties, Allende's moderate left-wing line was supported by moderate Socialists, Communists, Radicals (Social Democrats merged with that party in June 1972) and part of the MAPU (later: MAPU/OC), whereas the left-wing Socialists (led by Altamirano), the extremist elements of the MAPU, of the Christian Left and the MIR (not belonging to the Unidad Popular) represented the far-left.

During its first year in office, the Allende Government achieved economic growth, reductions in inflation and unemployment, a redistribution of income, and an increase in consumption. The government also significantly increased salaries and wages, reduced taxes, and introduced free distribution of some items of prime necessity. Groups which had previously been excluded from the state labor insurance scheme (mainly the self-employed and small businessmen) were included for the first time, while pensions were increased for widows, invalids, orphans, and the elderly. The National Milk Plan affected 50% of Chilean children in 1970, providing 3,470,000 with half a litre of milk daily, free of charge.

The land-redistribution that Allende highlighted as one of the central policies of his government had already begun under his predecessor Eduardo Frei Montalva, who had expropriated between one-fifth and one-quarter of all properties liable to takeover. The Allende government's intention was to appropriate all holdings of more than eighty basic irrigated hectares. Allende also intended to improve the socio-economic welfare of Chile's poorest citizens; a key element was to provide employment, either in the new nationalized enterprises or on public works projects.

Towards the end of 1971, Fidel Castro toured Chile extensively during a four-week visit. This gave credence to the belief of those on the right that "The Chilean Way to Socialism" was an effort to put Chile on the same path as Cuba.

Economics

The short-term economic results of Minister of Economics Pedro Vuskovic's expansive monetary policy were unambiguously favorable: 12% industrial growth and an 8.6% increase in GDP, accompanied by major declines in Chile’s long-endemic chronic inflation (down from 34.9% to 22.1%) and unemployment (down to 3.8%). In 1972 the Chilean escudo changed 140%. The average Real GDP contracted between 1971 and 1973 at an annual rate of 5.6% ("negative growth"), and the government's fiscal deficit soared while foreign reserves declined. During this time, a shortage in basic commodities led to the rise of black markets which ended in late 1973 after Allende was ousted.

In addition to the earlier-discussed provision of employment, Allende also raised wages on a number of occasions throughout 1970 and 1971. These rises in wages were negated by continuing increases in prices for food. Although price rises had also been high under Frei (27% a year between 1967 and 1970), a basic basket of consumer goods rose by 120% from 190 to 421 escudos in one month alone, August 1972. In the period 1970-72, while Allende was in government, exports fell 24% and imports rose 26%, with imports of food rising an estimated 149%. Although nominal wages were rising, there was not a commensurate increase in the standard of living for the Chilean population.

The falls in exports were mostly due to a fall in the price of copper. Chile was at the mercy of international fluctuations in the value of its single most important export. As with almost half of developing countries, more than 50 percent of Chile's export receipts were from a single primary commodity. Adverse fluctuation in the international price of copper negatively affected the Chilean economy throughout 1971-72. The price of copper fell from a peak of $66 per ton in 1970 to only $48–49 in 1971 and 1972. In addition to the hyperinflation, the fall in the value of copper and lack of economic aid would further depress the economy.

Initially, the governing coalition expected the unearned wage increases and the consequent increase in government spending to be corrected once the 'structural changes' like nationalisation and agrarian reforms were completed. However, by June 1972, Allende was beginning to see the economic hazards. The minister of economy was changed and some austerity measures introduced, but to little avail.

Amidst declining economic indicators, Allende's Popular Unity coalition actually increased its vote to 43 percent in the parliamentary elections early in 1973. However, by this point what had started as an informal alliance with the Christian Democrats was anything but that. The Christian Democrats now leagued with the right-wing National Party and other three minor parties to oppose Allende's government, the five parties calling themselves the Confederation of Democracy (CODE). The conflict between the executive and legislature paralyzed initiatives from either side. His economic policies were used by economists Rudi Dornbusch and Sebastian Edwards to coin the term macroeconomic populism.

Foreign interference and relations

Argentina
Allende received the 1973 election of Héctor Cámpora, who had previously lived in exile in Chile, as good news. Allende sent in Aniceto Rodríguez to Buenos Aires to work on an alliance between the Socialist Party of Chile and the Justicialism. Later Allende assisted to the presidential inauguration of Campora. All of this was seen with good eyes by Juan Perón who came to refer to Allende as "compañero". However Perón also used Allende as a warning example for the most radical of his followers. In September just a few days before the 1973 Chilean coup d'etat he addressed the Tendencia Revolucionaria:

Perón condemned the 1973 coup as a "fatality for the continent" stating that the coup leader Augusto Pinochet represented interests "well known" to him. He praised Allende for his "valiant attitude" of committing suicide. He took note of the role of the United States in instigating the coup by recalling his familiarity with coup-making processes.

Soviet Union
Salvador Allende's predecessor, President Frei, improved relations with the USSR. In February 1970, President Frei's government signed Chile's first cultural and scientific agreement with the Soviet Union.

Allende's Popular Unity government tried to maintain normal relations with the United States, but when Chile nationalized its copper industry, Washington cut off U.S. credits and increased its support to opposition. Forced to seek alternative sources of trade and finance, Chile gained commitments from the USSR to invest some $400 million in Chile in the next six years.

Allende's government was disappointed that it received far less economic assistance from the Soviet Union than it hoped for. Trade between the two countries did not significantly increase and the credits were mainly linked to the purchase of Soviet equipment. Moreover, credits from Soviet Union were much less than those provided by China and countries of Eastern Europe. When Allende visited Soviet Union in late 1972 in search of more aid and additional lines of credit, he was turned down.

Allegations have been made in a book by Christopher Andrew, based on the handwritten notes of alleged KGB archivist Vasili Mitrokhin, that Allende was connected to the KGB. However, the belief that Allende was a KGB agent is not universal.

Declarations from KGB General Nikolai Leonov, former Deputy Chief of the First Chief Directorate of the State Security Committee of the KGB, state that the Soviet Union supported Allende's government economically, politically and militarily. Leonov stated in an interview at the Chilean Center of Public Studies (CEP) that the Soviet economic support included over $100 million in credit, three fishing ships (that distributed 17,000 tons of frozen fish to the population), factories (as help after the 1971 earthquake), 3,100 tractors, 74,000 tons of wheat, and more than a million tins of condensed milk.

In mid-1973, the USSR had approved the delivery of weapons (artillery, tanks) to the Chilean Army. However, when news of an attempt from the Army to depose Allende through a coup d'état reached Soviet officials, the shipment was redirected to another country.

United States opposition to Allende

The United States opposition to Allende started several years before he was elected President of Chile. Declassified documents show that from 1962 through 1964, the CIA spent $3 million in anti-Allende propaganda "to scare voters away from Allende's FRAP coalition", and spent a total of $2.6 million to finance the presidential campaign of Eduardo Frei.

U.S. President Richard Nixon, then embroiled in the Vietnam War and Cold War with the Soviet Union, was openly hostile to the possibility of a second socialist regime (after Cuba) in the Western Hemisphere. There was clandestine support by the U.S. government to prevent Allende from taking office after election: On 16 October 1970, a formal instruction was issued to the CIA base in Chile, saying in part, "It is firm and continuing policy that Allende be overthrown by a coup. It would be much preferable to have this transpire prior to 24 October, but efforts in this regard will continue vigorously beyond this date. We are to continue to generate maximum pressure toward this end, utilizing every appropriate resource. It is imperative that these actions be implemented clandestinely and securely so that the USG and American hand be well hidden".

Regarding the botched attempted-kidnapping and manslaughter of Chilean Army Commander René Schneider on 22 October 1970 (Schneider was a constitutionalist opposed to the idea of a coup preventing Allende from taking office or removing him after the fact), the Church Committee observed: "The CIA attempted, directly, to foment a military coup in Chile. It passed three weapons to a group of Chilean officers who plotted a coup. Beginning with the kidnapping of Chilean Army Commander-in-Chief Rene Schneider. However, those guns were returned. The group which staged the abortive kidnap of Schneider, which resulted in his death, apparently was not the same as the group which received CIA weapons." However, the group which killed Schneider had previously been in contact with the CIA. The agency later paid that group $35,000, according to the Hinchey report, "in an effort to keep the prior contact secret, maintain the good will of the group, and for humanitarian reasons". CIA documents indicate that while the CIA had sought his kidnapping, his killing was never intended. Public outrage over the killing of Schneider cooled sentiments for a coup, and neither the U.S. nor Chilean military attempted other removal actions in the early years of the Allende administration. On 26 October, President Eduardo Frei Montalva (Salvador Allende was inaugurated 3 November) named General Carlos Prats as commander in chief of the army in replacement of René Schneider. Carlos Prats was also a constitutionalist.

With Allende in office, the United States reduced economic aid to the Chilean government.

In 1973, the CIA was notified by contacts of the impending Pinochet coup two days in advance, but contends it "played no direct role" in the coup. After Pinochet assumed power, U.S. Secretary of State Henry Kissinger told Nixon that the United States "didn't do it" (referring to the coup itself) but had "created the conditions as great  as possible".

Crisis
In October 1972, Chile saw the first of what were to be a wave of confrontational strikes led by some of the historically well-off sectors of Chilean society; these received the open support of United States President Richard Nixon. A strike by trucking company owners, which the CIA supported by funding them with US$2 million within the frame of the "September Plan", began on 9 October 1972.  The strike was declared by the Confederación Nacional del Transporte, then presided by León Vilarín, one of the leaders of the far-right paramilitary group Patria y Libertad. The Confederation, which brought together 165 trucking company business associations, employing 40,000 drivers and 56,000 vehicles, decreed an indefinite strike, paralyzing the country.

It was soon joined by the small businessmen, some (mostly professional) unions, and some student groups. Its leaders (Vilarín, Jaime Guzmán, Rafael Cumsille, Guillermo Elton and Eduardo Arriagada) expected to topple the government through the strike. Other than the inevitable damage to the economy, the chief effect of the 24-day strike was to bring the head of the army, general Carlos Prats, into the government as Interior Minister, as a sign of appeasement. Carlos Prats had succeeded General René Schneider after his assassination on 24 October 1970, by two groups, General Roberto Viaux and General Camilo Valenzuela, who had benefitted from logistical and financial support from the CIA. Prats was a supporter of the legalist Schneider doctrine and refused to involve the military in a coup against Allende.

In March and July 1972, Allende and the Christian Democrats tried to forge a compromise. The moderate Party of the Radical Left, representing the UP coalition in March, held talks with the Christian Democratic Party over regulations of nationalized firms, but ultimately failed, as the minister of economy Pedro Vuskovic boycotted the negotiations and carried out legally dubious expropriations. As a result, the Radical Left also left the UP coalition, hence the coalition lost 5 senators and 7 deputies. In July, the resumed talks were almost going to succeed, until the more conservative elements within the Christian Democrat party managed to break off the negotiations. From that point on, the political life of the country was highly polarized between two opposing camps: the governing left-wing Unidad Popular and the right-wing opposition of Christian Democrats who were allied with the National Party, a vehemently right-wing opposition party.

Tanquetazo

Congressional resolutions
On 22 August 1973, the Christian Democrats and the National Party members of the Chamber of Deputies voted 81 to 47, a resolution that asked the authorities to "put an immediate end" to "breach[es of] the Constitution...with the goal of redirecting government activity toward the path of Law and ensuring the Constitutional order of our Nation, and the essential underpinnings of democratic co-existence among Chileans".

The resolution declared that the Allende Government sought "to conquer absolute power with the obvious purpose of subjecting all citizens to the strictest political and economic control by the State...[with] the goal of establishing a totalitarian system", claiming it had made "violations of the Constitution...a permanent system of conduct". Essentially, most of the accusations were about the Socialist Government disregarding the separation of powers, and arrogating legislative and judicial prerogatives to the executive branch of government.

President Allende's efforts to re-organize the military and the police forces were characterised as "notorious attempts to use the armed and police forces for partisan ends, destroy their institutional hierarchy, and politically infiltrate their ranks".

Two days later, on 24 August 1973, Allende responded, point-by point to the accusations and, in turn, accused Congress of "facilitat[ing] the seditious intention of certain sectors" and promoting a coup or a civil war by "invoking the intervention of the Armed Forces and of Order against a democratically elected government". He pointed out that the declaration had failed to obtain the required two-thirds majority constitutionally required to bring an accusation against the president and argued that the legislature was trying to usurp the executive role.

He wrote, "Chilean democracy is a conquest by all of the people. It is neither the work nor the gift of the exploiting classes, and it will be defended by those who, with sacrifices accumulated over generations, have imposed it...With a tranquil conscience...I sustain that never before has Chile had a more democratic government than that over which I have the honor to preside". He concluded by calling upon "the workers, all democrats and patriots" to join him in defense of the constitution and of the "revolutionary process".

Final coup

In early September 1973, Allende floated the idea of resolving the crisis with a referendum. However, the Chilean military seized the initiative of the Chamber of Deputies' 22 August Resolution (which had implored Allende's military removal) to oust Allende on 11 September 1973. As the Presidential Palace was surrounded and bombed, Allende committed suicide.

See also
 Vuskovic plan - UP's economic policy
 Chilean nationalization of copper
 Death of Salvador Allende - controversy regarding his death
 Project Cybersyn

Notes

References
 Alan Angell (1993). Chile de Alessandri a Pinochet: En busca de la utopía. Santiago: Editorial Andrés Bello.
 Simon Collier & William F. Sater (1996). A History of Chile: 1808-1994. Cambridge: Cambridge University Press.
 Julio Faundez (1988). Marxism and democracy in Chile: From 1932 to the fall of Allende, New Haven: Yale University Press.
 Anke Hoogvelt (1997). Globalisation and the postcolonial world, London: Macmillan.
 Henry Kissinger (1970). National Security Decision 93: Policy Towards Chile, Washington: National Security Council.
 Alec Nove (1986). Socialism, Economics and Development, London: Allen & Unwin.
 Don Mabry (2003). Chile: Allende's Rise and Fall.
Sebastián Hurtado-Torres. 2019. "The Chilean Moment in the Global Cold War: International Reactions to Salvador Allende's Victory in the Presidential Election of 1970." Journal of Cold War studies.

External links
 An extensive Spanish-language site providing a day-by-day chronology of the Allende era. The research and detail are enormous.
 The 22 August 1973 document under which the Chamber of Deputies opposed the Allende regime. This is a solid translation of the document, although the introductory note is clearly that of an apologist for the coup.
  Examination of the coup that ended the Allende presidency, including ties to direction by the CIA.
  Allende's 24 August 1973 response
 National Security Archive's Chile Documentation Project which provides documents obtained from FOIA requests regarding U.S. involvement in Chile, beginning with attempts to promote a coup in 1970 and continuing through U.S. support for Pinochet
 LIFE Magazine July 16, 1971 "Allende: A special kind of Marxist"

 
1970 establishments in Chile
1973 disestablishments in Chile
Politics of Chile
Presidential Republic (1925–1973)